HXX can refer to:

Hay Airport, New South Wales, Australia (IATA code)
Heathrow Terminals 2 & 3 railway station, London, United Kingdom (National Rail code)
Huxiaoxing station, Zhejiang, China (Station code)